SafeSearch is a feature in Google Search and Google Images that acts as an automated filter of pornography and potentially offensive and inappropriate content.

On November 11, 2009, Google introduced the ability for users with Google Accounts to lock on the SafeSearch level in Google's web and image searches. Once configured, a password is required to change the setting.

On December 12, 2012, Google removed the option to turn off the filter entirely, requiring users to enter more specific search queries to access adult content.

SafeSearch is also often used on school computers, to prevent schoolchildren from accessing pornographic content.

Government and internet companies can enforce safesearch.

Effectiveness 
A report by Harvard Law School's Berkman Center for Internet & Society stated that SafeSearch excluded many innocuous websites from search-result listings, including ones created by the White House, IBM, the American Library Association and Liz Claiborne. On the other hand, many pornographic images slip through the filter, even when "innocent" search terms are entered. Blacklisting certain search terms is hindered by homographs (e.g., "beaver"), blacklisting certain URLs is rendered ineffective by the changing URLs of porn sites, and software to tag images with copious amounts of flesh tones as pornographic content is problematic because there are a variety of skin tones and pictures of babies tend to have a lot of flesh tones. Google's ability to filter porn has been an important factor in its relationship with the People's Republic of China.

References

Google Search
Content-control software